The West Indies cricket team toured Bangladesh in January and February 2021 to play two Tests and three One Day International (ODI) matches. The Test series formed part of the inaugural 2019–2021 ICC World Test Championship and the ODI series formed part of the inaugural 2020–2023 ICC Cricket World Cup Super League.

On 29 December 2020, Cricket West Indies announced their squads for the tour, with Kraigg Brathwaite and Jason Mohammed named as captains for the Test and ODI matches respectively. Regular Test and ODI captains Jason Holder and Kieron Pollard were two of ten players who opted not to travel due to COVID-19 concerns or personal reasons. Shakib Al Hasan was named in Bangladesh's ODI squad, after serving a year-long ban for failing to report a corrupt approach.

The first ODI saw seven cricketers make their debut in the format, six of them for the West Indies. Bangladesh won the opening match by six wickets, with more than 16 overs to spare. Bangladesh won the second ODI by seven wickets to take an unassailable lead in the series. Bangladesh won the third and final ODI by 120 runs, taking the series 3–0.

The West Indies won the first Test by three wickets, with Kyle Mayers scoring an unbeaten double century on debut. The West Indies also won the second Test, by 17 runs, to take the series 2–0.

Background
Originally, the tour was scheduled to have three Tests, three ODIs and two Twenty20 International (T20I) matches. In October 2020, the Bangladesh Cricket Board (BCB) announced that the Bangabandhu T20 Cup would be used as the criteria to select players for the T20I matches. In November 2020, the BCB sent details of their bio-bubble plan to Cricket West Indies (CWI). Officials from CWI visited Bangladesh during November and December 2020, and reported that they were "very impressed" with the COVID-19 protocols in the country.

In November 2020, the two cricket boards also looked at the possibility of reducing the tour by one Test match, per a request that was made by the West Indies. In December 2020, both cricket boards agreed to play two Test matches instead of three, and dropped the T20I fixtures from the tour itinerary. On 10 January 2021, the BCB updated the tour itinerary, including changing the start times of the ODI matches and reducing the four-day tour match to a three-day fixture.

Bangladesh did not have any umpires on the Elite Panel of ICC Umpires. As a result, England's Richard Illingworth was named as one of the umpires for the Test matches, the first time since the start of the COVID-19 pandemic that a neutral umpire was named for a Test series.

Squads

Romario Shepherd was ruled out of the West Indies' squad due to a positive test for COVID-19, with Keon Harding named as his replacement. On 15 January 2021, Hayden Walsh Jr. was also ruled out of the West Indies' squad for testing positive for COVID-19. Shakib Al Hasan was ruled out of Bangladesh's squad for the second Test due to a thigh injury, with Soumya Sarkar named as his replacement. Shadman Islam was also ruled out of Bangladesh's squad for the second Test, due to a hip injury.

Tour match

ODI series

1st ODI

2nd ODI

3rd ODI

Test series

1st Test

2nd Test

Notes

References

External links
 Series home at ESPN Cricinfo

2021 in Bangladeshi cricket
2021 in West Indian cricket
International cricket competitions in 2020–21
West Indian cricket tours of Bangladesh